Basques have been living in Northern Nevada for over a century and form a population of several thousand. Basque immigrants first came in the mid-1800s during the Gold rush. The Basques have also been closely-tied to sheep herding in Nevada and neighboring states.

The Basque-American culture in especially prominent in the town of Winnemucca. Basque immigrants to Winnemucca founded the Martin Hotel and the Winnemucca Hotel, both of which were associated with the Basque sheepherders.

References

Further reading
 Douglass, William, and Jon Bilbao. Amerikanuak: Basques in the New World. (University of Nevada Press, 1975).
 Saitua, Iker. Basque Immigrants and Nevada's Sheep Industry: Geopolitics and the Making of an Agricultural Workforce, 1880–1954 (2019) excerpt

External links
The Basques in Nevada
Basque Americans in Nevada
Nevada Basque Food
Basque Digital Collection University of Nevada, Reno Libraries
Voices from Basque America University of Nevada, Reno Libraries

Basque-American culture in Nevada